EyesOn Design are a series of events including an annual car show and a fundraiser for the Detroit Institute of Ophthalmology. It has become a national event focused on the emotion and character of automotive design.

History 
The Eyes on Design Show was established in the late 1986 as both celebration of automotive design and a fundraiser for the Detroit Institute of Ophthalmology, a nonprofit organization in Grosse Pointe Park, Michigan, devoted to matters pertaining to the eye and vision.

The first shows were called "Eyes On The Classics" and were held in the Grosse Pointe Academy parking lots. Initially focused on the domestic "Big Three" (General Motors, Ford and Chrysler), the show was expanded to include automakers from around the world. The name was also changed to "EyesOn Design". For its third show, the venue moved to the grounds of the Edsel and Eleanor Ford House.

To ease access and accommodate the increasing public attendance, the design chiefs at DaimlerChrysler, Ford, and General Motors suggested that the event be hosted by one of their companies each year. The 2002 show was held at the Chrysler Headquarters and Technology Center in Auburn Hills, Michigan. The theme for this 15th anniversary weekend-long show was "Performance Vehicles".

In 2003, the General Motors Technical Center in Warren, Michigan hosted the event. According to General Motors, the 2003 event was the largest, most complete collection of concept vehicles ever assembled representing the very best efforts of GM, Ford, Chrysler, and other automakers. The three-day event was also the first time the GM Design Center was open to the general public. Attendees also had the opportunity to purchase rides in notable GM concept cars.

A Founding Chairman of the annual EyesOn Design event, Chuck Jordan, was commemorated during the January 2011 North American International Auto Show in Detroit. The EyesOn Design show celebrated its 25th anniversary during summer 2012, on the grounds of the Edsel and Eleanor Ford House with over 200 vehicles displayed by invitation only.

Design focus 
The "Eyes on Design Show" has grown from an East Side show to an automobile exhibition of national and international significance.

According to the Ford Motor Company, the Eyes on Design Show is the world's only car show to focus on the emotion and character of automotive design.

Bringing together some 250 concept cars in one place is the secret of the show's success that has been driven by the enthusiastic assistance of automotive design executives. In addition to vehicles from various automakers, the event also features concept cars by invitation from some of the world's most renowned vintage automobile collectors and restorers.

The vehicles shown at the annual event are by invitation. Judging in numerous classes is "based not on the quality of the restoration or authenticity"; rather it is on the basis of their "the design character, emotional appeal and artistic excellence of the vehicle."

Lifetime Design Achievement 
The EyesOn Design celebrations include the prestigious "Lifetime Design Achievement" award. This recognition is given to an accomplished automotive designer selected by previous winners of this award.

 2022 - Pete Brock, deferred from 2020 and 2021 due to the COVID-19 pandemic in Michigan
 2019 - Leonardo Fioravanti
 2018 - Edward T. Welburn
 2017 - Syd Mead
 2016 - Stewart Reed 
 2015 - Patrick Le Quément
 2014 - Peter Schreyer
 2013 - Wayne Cherry
 2012 - Chris Bangle
 2011 - Walter de'Silva
 2010 - Shiro Nakamura
 2009 - Willie G. Davidson
 2008 - Robert A. Lutz
 2007 - Marcello Gandini
 2006 - Jack Telnack 
 2005 - Chuck Jordan
 2004 - Charles Pelly  
 2002 - Tom Gale
 2001 - Giorgetto Giugiaro
 2000 - Design Visionaries of the 20th Century 
 1999 - Dick Teague
 1998 - George W. Walker
 1997 - Bruno Sacco
 1996 - General Motors Styling Staff, 1937-1972 
 1995 - The Raymond Loewy Studebaker Design Team  and the Porsche family
 1994 -  Homer LeGassey  and Nuccio Bertone
 1993 - LeBaron Carrossiers
 1992 - William Lyons
 1991 - Harley Earl and Sergio Pininfarina
 1990 - Virgil Exner and Eugene T. "Bob" Gregorie
 1989 - Strother MacMinn and Bill Mitchell
 1988 - Gordon Buehrig

References

External links 
 
 Official EyesOn Design information (archived website from 2010)

Auto shows in the United States
Design events
Vehicle design